Myodes coronavirus 2JL14 is a species of coronavirus in the genus Betacoronavirus.

References

Betacoronaviruses